"Movin' On" is a song recorded by Canadian music group The Rankins. It was released in 1998 as the first single from their fifth studio album, Uprooted. It peaked in the top 10 on the RPM Country Tracks chart.

Chart performance

Year-end charts

References

1998 songs
1998 singles
The Rankin Family songs
EMI Records singles
Songs written by Jimmy Rankin